= Bangladesh women's cricket team in India in 2025–26 =

International cricket tour

	India	Bangladesh
- Date: December 2025

One Day International series

Twenty20 International series

The Bangladesh women's cricket team was scheduled to tour India in December 2025 to play the India women's cricket team. The tour would consist of three One Day International (ODI) and three Twenty20 Internationals (T20I) matches. However, in November 2025, the series was postponed.
